Halarachne americana, the Caribbean monk seal nasal mite, was a species of mite that inhabited the nasal cavity of the Caribbean monk seal. Following the extinction of the Caribbean monk seal in 1952, the mite was unable to adapt and subsequently went extinct.

References

Mesostigmata
Extinct arachnids